Rendezvous in Paris is a 1982 psychological thriller film written and directed by Gabi Kubach, based on the 1935 novel Das große Einmaleins by Vicki Baum. The film stars Claude Jade, Harald Kuhlmann, Barry Stokes and Vérénice Rudolph.

Plot
In Berlin in 1930, sensitive Evelyne Droste leads a sheltered life married to respectable lawyer Kurt. The children are cared for by a governess and a nanny, and she feels somehow superfluous and unfulfilled on a personal level. But when she meets the American Frank Davies at a party, her passion and vitality return. Evelyn finally agrees to Frank's invitation for a weekend in Paris. But while Evelyn puts her middle-class life on the line, for Frank it is perhaps only an adventure.

Cast
 Claude Jade as Evelyne Droste
  as Kurt Droste
 Barry Stokes as Frank Davis
  as Marianne
 Nina Divíšková as Gouvernante at Droste
 Marie Horáková as Veronika
 Gunther Malzacher as Von Gebhardt
 Chantal Bronner as Mlle Michel
 Frantisek Peterka as Herr Rupp
 Barbara Morawiecz as Frau Rupp

See also
 The Glass Castle (1950)

External links

References

1982 films
1980s German-language films
1980s psychological thriller films
Films based on Austrian novels
Films set in 1930
Films set in Berlin
Films set in Paris
French psychological thriller films
German psychological thriller films
Remakes of French films
West German films
1980s French films
1980s German films